Laurent Leroy (born 16 April 1976) is a French former professional footballer who played as a forward.

Career
Leroy joined Paris Saint Germain in 1999. He did not become a regular starter in his time there. In January 2003 he joined Troyes AC on loan for the remainder of the 2002–03 season.

References

External links
 
 
 

Living people
1976 births
People from Saint-Saulve
Sportspeople from Nord (French department)
French footballers
Footballers from Hauts-de-France
Association football forwards
Valenciennes FC players
AS Cannes players
Paris Saint-Germain F.C. players
Servette FC players
ES Troyes AC players
Neuchâtel Xamax FCS players
FC Girondins de Bordeaux players
US Créteil-Lusitanos players
Shanghai Shenhua F.C. players
ÉFC Fréjus Saint-Raphaël players
RC Grasse players
French expatriate footballers
Expatriate footballers in Switzerland
French expatriate sportspeople in Switzerland
Expatriate footballers in China
French expatriate sportspeople in China